Akira Tachikawa (1961ｰ) is a Japanese countertenor, described as "one of a very few accomplished Japanese counter-tenors".

A 1980 graduate of the Tokyo National University of Fine Arts and Music, in which he studied under Kounosuke Watanabe and Ryousuke Hatanaka, he has since obtained work as a singer, particularly in Baroque music in Europe, where he moved in 1986. He has performed with the Bach Collegium Japan under their conductor Masaaki Suzuki.

Discography
In 1995 he was a soloist in the first volume of Bach Collegium Japan's recording of the complete Bach cantatas on BIS Records. After these performances of the early cantatas BWV 4 and BWV 150 he went on to record other cantatas and the Magnificat BWV 243.

Contemporary music:
 A.Danilevski. 'Koans. Fragment of Consciousness'. 2016, Centaur, USA, CRS 348 (ensemble Syntagma)
 A.Danilevski. 'The Uncertainty Principle", 2012, Carpe Diem, D (ensemble Syntagma)
Early Music
 Songé .i.songe. J. de Lescurel. Chansons et Dit enté. 2014, Facsimile Rec., (ensemble Syntagma)
 Rosa et Orticha. 2012, Carpe Diem, D. (ensemble Syntagma)
 Stylems. Italian music from XIVth c., 2012, Challenge Classics, NL (ensemble Syntagma)
 Gautier d'Epinal. Remembrance. 2008, Challenge Classics, NL (ensemble Syntagma)
 Touz esforciez. Trouvères en Lorraine. 2004, Pierre Verany, F (ensemble Syntagma)

References

20th-century Japanese male opera singers
Living people
Bach singers
Countertenors
Year of birth missing (living people)
Tokyo University of the Arts alumni
Place of birth missing (living people)
21st-century Japanese male opera singers